Lemar Willie Marshall (born December 17, 1976) is a former American football linebacker. He was originally signed by the Tampa Bay Buccaneers as an undrafted free agent in 1999.  He played college football at Michigan State.

High school career
Marshall was a first-team All-State pick as a senior at St. Xavier High School in Cincinnati, where he graduated in 1995. Lemar was a three-year starter at cornerback for the Bomber football team, including his sophomore year when he played on the state finalist squad. He was first-team all-GCL and all-city as a junior and senior and was a first-team All-Ohio pick as a senior. Lemar also earned three letters in basketball and was a second-team all-GCL pick as a senior. He was inducted into the school's Hall of  Fame in 2008.

College career
Marshall was recruited by Michigan State University in 1995.  He played in 11 games as a true freshman, including two at cornerback.  As a sophomore in 1996, he posted 54 stops in 12 games.  He started four of 12 games at strong safety as a junior, recording 79 tackles in 1997.  As a senior in 1998, he finished third on the team with a career-high 101 tackles, and also recorded two interceptions, breaking up 16 other passes.  At Michigan State, Marshall lettered all four years, compiling 261 tackles and 27 passes defensed. He was a merchandising management major.

Professional career

1999-2000
Marshall entered the National Football League as an undrafted free agent with the Tampa Bay Buccaneers in 1999.  He spent parts of 1999 and 2000 on the practice squads of the Buccaneers and the Philadelphia Eagles.

2001
In 2001, he spent training camp with the Denver Broncos before being released in early September.  Marshall signed with the Washington Redskins in late 2001.

2002
In 2002, he made his professional debut in Week 1 against the Arizona Cardinals.  He went on to play all 16 games as a reserve linebacker and on special teams coverage units.  He posted nine total tackles, mostly on special teams.

2003
In 2003, Marshall played in 12 games, primarily on special teams units but also logged some action at reserve linebacker, getting ten total tackles and 0.5 sacks. He was inactive for four games.

2004
In 2004, Marshall had a breakthrough season, starting 14 games at outside linebacker when LaVar Arrington was sidelined with a knee injury.  Marshall stepped up, recording 69 tackles and 1.5 sacks.

2005
During the 2004 season, Marshall started all 16 games, recording 98 tackles and 2 sacks, as well as four interceptions, two forced fumbles, and one defensive touchdown.  Marshall anchored the middle of the defense as the Redskins made the playoffs for the first time since 1999.

2006
In 2006, he didn't perform as well because he was bothered by knee and ankle injuries. However, he managed to get a career-high of 104 tackles.  This was the only time in his professional career that he had over 100 tackles, along with his 1.5 sacks and 1 safety.

2007
Lemar Marshall signed a one-year contract with his hometown-Bengals August 23, 2007, two days after a surprise move by the Washington Redskins who released him in training camp. He appeared in four games for the Bengals, starting three, and recorded eight tackles, 1 sack, 1 forced fumble, and 1 safety.
However, he was placed on the injured reserve with a ruptured Achilles tendon after his fourth game. He was not retained by Cincinnati.

Currently
He is currently the Co-Owner (w/ Adrian Noorestani) of an advanced fitness studio called Phenom Strength & Conditioning in Ashburn Virginia.  They train a wide variety of age groups, provide nutritional advice, and even have NFL Combine Training. The company website is phenomsc.com

References

1976 births
Living people
Tampa Bay Buccaneers players
Philadelphia Eagles players
Washington Redskins players
Cincinnati Bengals players
American football middle linebackers
African-American players of American football
Michigan State Spartans football players
St. Xavier High School (Ohio) alumni
21st-century African-American sportspeople
20th-century African-American sportspeople